Henry County Airport  is a public use airport located three nautical miles (6 km) east of the central business district of Napoleon, a city in Henry County, Ohio, United States. It is owned by the Henry County Airport Authority. This airport is included in the National Plan of Integrated Airport Systems for 2011–2015, which categorized it as a general aviation facility.

Facilities and aircraft 
Henry County Airport covers an area of 47 acres (19 ha) at an elevation of 683 feet (208 m) above mean sea level. It has one runway designated 10/28 with an asphalt surface measuring 4,000 by 65 feet (1,219 x 20 m).

For the 12-month period ending July 13, 2011, the airport had 15,637 aircraft operations, an average of 42 per day: 99% general aviation, <1% air taxi, and <1% military.
At that time there were 21 aircraft based at this airport: 81% single-engine, 14% helicopter, and 5% multi-engine.

References

External links 
 Aerial image as of April 1994 from USGS The National Map
 

Airports in Ohio
Buildings and structures in Henry County, Ohio
Transportation in Henry County, Ohio